Edward Sanford may refer to:

 Edward Sanford (New York politician) (1805–1876), American lawyer, writer and politician from New York
 Edward Ayshford Sanford (1794–1871), British Member of Parliament
 Edward J. Sanford (1831–1902), American manufacturing tycoon and financier
 Edward Terry Sanford (1865–1930), American jurist